Keoviengphet Liththideth (born 30 November 1992) is a Laotian footballer who plays as a midfielder for Master 7 in the Lao League 1.

International goals
Scores and results list Lao's goal tally first.

Individual

 AFF Young Player of the years (1): 2013

References 

1992 births
Living people
Laotian footballers
Laos international footballers
Association football midfielders
Footballers at the 2014 Asian Games
Asian Games competitors for Laos